Basharyat-e Sharqi Rural District is a rural district (dehestan) in Basharyat District, Abyek County, Qazvin Province, Iran. At the 2006 census, its population was 7,282, in 1,865 families.  The rural district has 20 villages.

References 

Rural Districts of Qazvin Province
Abyek County